Night Warriors: Darkstalkers' Revenge (originally titled  in Japan) is a four-episode OVA anime series by Madhouse Studios under license from Capcom, directed by Masashi Ikeda and originally released in 1997–1998. It is an adaptation of Capcom's Darkstalkers series of video games.

Plot
In the midst of a war between the families of Demitri Maximoff and Morrigan Aensland for control of the Demon World, alien invader Pyron arrives on Earth and plans to take it over by taking out those who stand a chance of stopping him, namely the Darkstalkers. Meanwhile, dhampir Donovan Baine seeks to rid himself of the cursed blood which runs through his veins.

Four of the original Darkstalkers, Anakaris, Rikuo, Sasquatch and Victor, were featured in the intro but not in the OVA's main storyline, apparently having been killed by Pyron in a flashback sequence shown in the beginning of the fourth episode.

Characters

Episodes
"Return of the Darkstalkers"
"Blood of the Darkstalkers, Power of the Darkstalkers"
"Pyron Descending"
"For Whom They Fight"

Production
Night Warriors: Darkstalkers' Revenge is based on the Darkstalkers series of gothic-themed fighting games by Capcom. Characters were designed by Shūkō Murase and the animation was done by Asami Endo and Yoshinori Kanada. The ending theme for the series, "Trouble Man" by Eikichi Yazawa, was also used as the opening theme in the Japanese home port of the video game Darkstalkers: The Night Warriors.

Release
By the time the first episode of the series was released in Japan, Viz Media had secured the U.S. rights and announced plans to release the series later in 1997. Despite this, Toshifumi Yoshida and Trish Ledoux did not produce an English-dubbed version until 1999. The series was released on VHS, DVD and UMD in 2000. The North American anime company Media Blasters distributed it via rental kiosks in 2010. The series was re-released on DVD in 2012 by Madman Entertainment. Discotek Media released a remastered version on DVD in both language versions in the fall of 2015 and on Blu-ray for the first time in 2022.

The original soundtrack CD for Night Warriors: Darkstalkers' Revenge: The Animated Series (B00004SPLQ) was released in the United States by Viz Music in 1998. The anime series' manga and drama CD adaptations of were published only in Japan.

Reception
Night Warriors: Darkstalkers' Revenge received good reviews in the Western game magazines, with scores including B+ from GameFan in America and 4/5 from Consoles + in France. Bryn Williams of Gamers' Republic too gave it a score of B+, praising its "superb" animation "with vivid colors and smooth motion," as well as "gorgeous" character designs. Dave Halverson from the same magazine opined it was "the finest video game-based anime produced to date," citing animation quality, "spectacular" and "breathtaking" art and vibrant colors; the English dubbing, "while not perfect," was described as very good.

Darkstalkers is featured in the 2009 book 500 Essential Anime Movies by Helen McCarthy. Richard Coombs of Blistered Thumbs ranked it as the seventh best video game cartoon in 2011.

References

External links

VIZ page
Pioneer Entertainment page
Madmen Entertainment page

1997 anime OVAs
Darkstalkers
Horror anime and manga
Madhouse (company)
OVAs based on video games
Vampires in animated film
Viz Media anime
Werewolves in animated film
Works based on Capcom video games
Discotek Media
Anime and manga about revenge
Anime film and television articles using incorrect naming style